Sandham may refer to:

People

 Andy Sandham (1890–1982), English cricketer
 Charles Freeman Sandham, (1781–1869) British soldier of the Napoleonic Wars
 Elijah Sandham (1875–1944), English socialist politician, Member of Parliament 1929–1931
 Henry Sandham (1842–1910), Canadian painter and illustrator
 Joseph Sandham (fl. 1896), British footballer 
 William Sandham (rugby) (1879–?), Welsh rugby union and rugby league player
 William Sandham (footballer) (1898–1963), English footballer
Others
 Sandham Memorial Chapel, Burghclere, Hampshire, England
 Sandham- Symphony Meets Classical Tamil, Music album
 Sandhamn, Island in the Stockholm Archipelago